The  Pittsburgh Power season was the third season for the franchise in the Arena Football League. The team was coached by Derek Stingley and played their home games at the Consol Energy Center.

Final roster

Standings

Regular season schedule
The Power began the season at home against the Utah Blaze on March 23. They closed the regular season on July 26, on the road against the Spokane Shock.

References

Pittsburgh Power
Pittsburgh Power seasons
Pittsburgh Power